The Globe Building was a ten-story office building located in the American city of Saint Paul, Minnesota.  Located in Downtown Saint Paul, it was built to serve as the headquarters of the Saint Paul Globe newspaper.

Designed by E. Townsend Mix, the building was designed in an eclectic Romanesque Revival style topped by an open-air tower that visitors could access and look out from. At the time it was built, it was the tallest office building in Saint Paul.

After the Saint Paul Globe folded in 1905, the building continued on as a general office building, undergoing several rounds of renovations (including the removal of its trademark tower in 1950). In 1959, the building was demolished to make way for the Degree of Honor Building which opened in 1961.

References

1880s architecture in the United States
Buildings and structures demolished in 1959
Skyscraper office buildings in Saint Paul, Minnesota
Commercial buildings completed in 1887
Demolished buildings and structures in Minnesota
Newspaper headquarters in the United States
Office buildings completed in 1887